Voskresensky District is the name of several administrative and municipal districts in Russia. The name is generally derived from or related to the root "voskreseniye" (resurrection).
Voskresensky District, Moscow Oblast, an administrative and municipal district of Moscow Oblast
Voskresensky District, Nizhny Novgorod Oblast, an administrative and municipal district of Nizhny Novgorod Oblast
Voskresensky District, Saratov Oblast, an administrative and municipal district of Saratov Oblast

See also
Voskresensky (disambiguation)
Voskresensk

References